The MG 18/80 is a car which was produced by MG Cars from 1928 to 1931 as a successor to the types 14/28 and 14/40.

Description

While its predecessors were very closely based on the "Bullnose" Morris Oxford, the MG 18/80 was the first model in which the factory had designed the chassis itself, and was the first car to have the typical MG grille with vertical standing slats and vertical center bar and higher set headlights. It was initially known as the 'MG Six'.

The MG 18/80 derived from the Morris Light Six/ Morris Six, for which Cecil Kimber had MG build a stronger chassis.

The Mark I and Mark II were available in a variety of body styles, two- and four-door, two- and four-seater and both closed and touring cars. The Mark I was built from 1928 to 1931, to a total of 501 examples. From 1929 onwards, the Mark II was offered in parallel, with 236 built.
 
The cars were equipped with six-cylinder inline engines with chain-driven overhead camshafts. They were of 2468 cc displacement and had a double carburetor with only one float chamber.

Mark III
The Mark III was referred to variously as '18/80 Tigress' and the '18/100' and was a racing version launched in 1930. Only five vehicles were produced.

There was no direct successor. Only in 1936 would the MG SA, the next large MG, come on the market.

References
David Culshaw, Peter Horrobin, The Complete Catalogue of British Cars 1895–1975, Dorchester, UK, Veloce Publishing PLC, 1997, .

18 80
Cars introduced in 1928
1920s cars